The 2018 season of the astronomy TV show Star Gazers starring Dean Regas and James Albury started on January 1, 2018.  The episodes from this season were listed as being a South Florida PBS WPBT original production and were copyrighted to South Florida PBS, Inc.

2018 season

References

External links 
  Star Gazer official website
 

Lists of Jack Horkheimer: Star Gazer episodes
2018 American television seasons